Curtis Leeper (born December 28, 1955) is a retired American soccer player who played professionally in the North American Soccer League, Major Indoor Soccer League and American Soccer League.

Leeper attended Florida International University, playing on the men's soccer team.  In 1977, he turned professional with the Fort Lauderdale Strikers of the North American Soccer League.  He spent two seasons with the Strikers before being traded to the Philadelphia Fury during the 1979 season.  In the fall of 1979, he began his indoor career with the Pittsburgh Spirit of the Major Indoor Soccer League. He would go on to play a single season with the Spirit as well as the Phoenix Inferno and Los Angeles Lazers.  From 1981 to 1983, Leeper played for the Carolina Lightnin' of the American Soccer League.  In 1984, he played for the Fort Lauderdale Sun of the United Soccer League.  After his retirement, he worked for Nike.

References

External links
 NASL/MISL stats

1955 births
Living people
People from Lebanon, Pennsylvania
American soccer players
American Soccer League (1933–1983) players
Carolina Lightnin' players
FIU Panthers men's soccer players
Fort Lauderdale Strikers (1977–1983) players
Fort Lauderdale Sun players
Los Angeles Lazers players
Major Indoor Soccer League (1978–1992) players
North American Soccer League (1968–1984) players
Philadelphia Fury (1978–1980) players
Phoenix Inferno players
Pittsburgh Spirit players
United Soccer League (1984–85) players
Association football defenders
Association football forwards
Soccer players from Pennsylvania